Tornike Jalaghonia (born   12 December 1998) is a Georgian Rugby Union player. His position is Flanker and he currently plays for Biarritz in the Rugby Pro D2. He was called in Georgia U20 squad for 2018 World Rugby Under 20 Championship.

Biography 
Trained at RC Jiki, he was recruited by the Olympic Biarritz in the summer of 2018. After two first seasons with the Espoirs team, he played his first match with the first team against Carcassonne in October 2020.

International career 
He played in the 2017 and 2018 Junior World Cups with the Georgia U20, making five appearances in each edition. In March 2020, he had his first selection with the Georgia team against Portugal. He was then selected to compete in the Autumn Nations Cup. His first international try was against Portugal at Rugby Europe 2021.

References

1998 births
Living people
Rugby union players from Georgia (country)
Rugby union flankers